Kristofer Hjeltnes may refer to:

Kristofer Kristofersson Hjeltnes (1856–1930), Norwegian horticulturist and politician
Kristofer Sjursson Hjeltnes (1730–1804), Norwegian farmer and businessman